Nikola Obrovac (born 18 June 1998) is a Croatian swimmer. He competed in the men's 50 metre breaststroke event at the 2017 World Aquatics Championships.

References

External links
 

1998 births
Living people
Croatian male swimmers
Swimmers from Zagreb
Swimmers at the 2014 Summer Youth Olympics
Swimmers at the 2018 Mediterranean Games
Swimmers at the 2015 European Games
European Games medalists in swimming
European Games silver medalists for Croatia
Youth Olympic gold medalists for Croatia
Male breaststroke swimmers
Mediterranean Games competitors for Croatia
21st-century Croatian people